Kahla is a town in the Saale-Holzland district, in Thuringia, Germany. It is situated on the river Saale, 14 km south of Jena.

Mayors 

1990–2012: Bernd Leube
2012–2018: Claudia Nissen
2018–incumbent: Jan Schönfeld

People who were born in Kahla 
 Johann Walter (1496-1570), composer, song poet, advisor for Martin Luther  for church singing
 Paul Rudolph (physicist) (1858-1935), physicist
 Bernd Jäger (born 1951), gymnast

References

External links
 Kahla Notgeld (Strong beer)
 Kahla Notgeld (Chess series)

Towns in Thuringia
Saale-Holzland-Kreis
Duchy of Saxe-Altenburg